Mikhail Anatolyevich Babichev (born 2 February 1995) is a Belarusian professional footballer who plays for Nõmme Kalju.

References

External links 
 
 

1995 births
Living people
Belarusian footballers
Belarusian expatriate footballers
Association football midfielders
FC Rubin Kazan players
FC Orsha players
FC Vitebsk players
FC Torpedo-BelAZ Zhodino players
FC Neman Grodno players
FK RFS players
Nõmme Kalju FC players
Belarusian Premier League players
Belarusian First League players
Latvian Higher League players
Belarusian expatriate sportspeople in Russia
Belarusian expatriate sportspeople in Italy
Belarusian expatriate sportspeople in Latvia
Belarusian expatriate sportspeople in Estonia
Expatriate footballers in Russia
Expatriate footballers in Italy
Expatriate footballers in Latvia
Expatriate footballers in Estonia
Meistriliiga players